Oral, known in Russian as Uralsk, is a city in northwestern Kazakhstan, at the confluence of the Ural and Chagan rivers close to the Russian border. As it is located on the western bank of the Ural river, it is considered geographically in Europe. It is the capital of the West Kazakhstan Region. The ethnic composition is dominated by Kazakhs (71%) and Russians (25%). Population:

Geography

Climate

The climate of Oral is continental with long cold winters and warm, often hot summers. Under the Köppen climate classification, Oral has a cold semiarid climate (Köppen Bsk). Summers are extremely hot considering its position north of the 51st parallel, but winters are more reminiscent of continental climates further east than Europe.

Sport

FC Akzhayik are a Kazakhstani football club based in Petr Atoyan Stadium.

Bandy is the principal sport in the city. Akzhayik Sports Club, based in the Yunost Stadium, is the only professional team in the country and plays in the second highest division of Russia. In September 2017, the Kazakhstan Bandy Federation bought the club.

The city sent a team to the Spartakiade 2009 and the finished second. All the players of the Under-23 national team in the 2013–14 season came from Oral. After the Kazakhstan national bandy team took the gold medal at the 2011 Asian Winter Games, the team came back to Oral in triumph.

References

External links

Oral
Cities and towns in Kazakhstan
Populated places in West Kazakhstan Region
Ural Oblast (Russian Empire)
Populated places established in 1613
1613 establishments in Russia